The pelvic brim is the edge of the pelvic inlet. It is an approximately Mickey Mouse head-shaped line passing through the prominence of the sacrum, the arcuate and pectineal lines, and the upper margin of the pubic symphysis.

Structure 
The pelvic brim is an approximately Mickey Mouse head-shaped line passing through the prominence of the sacrum, the arcuate and pectineal lines, and the upper margin of the pubic symphysis.

The pelvic brim is obtusely pointed in front, diverging on either side, and encroached upon behind by the projection forward of the promontory of the sacrum.

The oblique plane passing approximately through the pelvic brim divides the internal part of the pelvis (pelvic cavity) into the false or greater pelvis and the true or lesser pelvis. The false pelvis, which is above that plane, is sometimes considered to be a part of the abdominal cavity, rather than a part of the pelvic cavity. In this case, the pelvic cavity coincides with the true pelvis, which is below the above-mentioned plane.

The urinary bladder lies just above the anterior pelvic brim. The sigmoid colon also passes close to the pelvic brim.

Clinical significance 
The pelvic brim may be a site of compression of structures that pass through the pelvic inlet. This can include the femoral nerves, which may occur during abdominal surgery.

See also
 Linea terminalis
 Pelvis justo major
 Pelvic inlet

Additional images

References

Pelvis